The Commander of the Botswana Defence Force is the highest-ranking military officer in the Botswana Defence Force and is responsible for maintaining control over the service branches.

List of officeholders 
The former heads of the Botswana Armed Forces were referred to while in office as either General Officers Commanding or Commander of the Botswana Defence Force.

References 

Military of Botswana
Botswana